Terre Haute is an unincorporated community in Champaign County, in the U.S. state of Ohio.

History
Terre Haute was laid out and platted in 1836. The community was so named on account of its lofty elevation, Terre Haute being a name derived from the French meaning "high ground". A post office called Terre Haute was established in 1846, and discontinued in 1900.

References

Unincorporated communities in Champaign County, Ohio
Unincorporated communities in Ohio